Peter Board  (27 March 1858 – 12 February 1945) was an Australian educationist and public servant best known for his advocacy of education reform in New South Wales.

Board was born in Wingham, New South Wales, the son of a Scottish immigrant. He studied teaching in Sydney and later became a school inspector in country New South Wales. In 1905 he was appointed under-secretary and director of the Department of Public Instruction, a position he would hold until 1922. He oversaw the establishment of Sydney Teachers' College in 1906 and reforms such as a standardised curriculum overseen by a curriculum council and a high school leaving certificate.

He was appointed Companion of the Order of St Michael and St George in 1916.

See also
 Peter Board High School

References

1858 births
1945 deaths
Australian people of Scottish descent
Australian schoolteachers
Public servants of New South Wales
Australian educational theorists
Australian Companions of the Order of St Michael and St George